Cheragh Tappeh-ye Sofla (also Romanized as Cherāgh Tappeh-ye Soflá) is a village in Ahmadabad Rural District, Takht-e Soleyman District, Takab County, West Azerbaijan Province, Iran. At the 2006 census, its population was 648, in 134 families.

References 

Populated places in Takab County